Weekend At Bernie's is a live album by pop punk band The Queers, named for the 1989 film of the same name. The original lead singer, Wimpy Rutherford, joins the Queers on ten tracks.

Track listing
 "Ursula Finally Has Tits"
 "No Tit"
 "Brush Your Teeth"
 "Love Love Love"
 "I Hate Everything"
 "I Can't Stand You"
 "Slug"
 "My Old Man's A Fatso"
 "Night Of The Livid Queers"
 "I Can't Stop Farting"
 "I Want Cunt"
 "Monster Zero"
 "You're Tripping"
 "I Live This Life"
 "I Hate Your Fucking Guts"
 "Fuck You"
 "Ben Weasel"
 "Wimpy Drives Through Harlem" †
 "Noodlebrain"
 "Too Many Twinkies"
 "Goodbye California"
 "Jumping Jack Flash"
 "Rockaway Beach"
 "We'd Have A Riot Doing Heroin" †
 "Terminal Rut" †
 "Fagtown" †
 "Macarthur's Park" †
 "Caught Smoking Pot" †
 "Kicked Out Of The Webelos" †
 "I'm Useless" †
 "This Place Sucks" †
 "Love Me" †
 "Batman"

† = Vocals by Wimpy Rutherford

Personnel
 Joe Queer - Vocals, Guitar
 Phillip Hill - Bass, Vocals
 Dave Trevino - Drums, Vocals
 Wimpy - Vocals
 Evil Presley - Vocals on Rockaway Beach
 Don B - Vocals on Batman

The Queers albums
2006 live albums